The Tourist is a thriller drama television series. It stars Jamie Dornan as the victim of a car crash who wakes up in hospital with amnesia.

The series premiered on 1 January 2022 on BBC One in the UK, the next day on Stan in Australia, and March 3 on HBO Max in the US. It is distributed internationally by All3Media.

In March 2022, the series was officially renewed for a second season.

Plot
When a Northern Irish man wakes up with amnesia in an Australian hospital, he must use what few clues he has to discover his identity before his past catches up with him.

Cast and characters
 Jamie Dornan as The Man/Elliot Stanley
 Danielle Macdonald as Probationary Constable Helen Chambers
 Shalom Brune-Franklin as Luci Miller/Victoria/Emma Halliwell
 Ólafur Darri Ólafsson as Billy Nixon
 Alex Dimitriades as Kosta Panigiris
 Genevieve Lemon as Sue
 Danny Adcock as Ralph
 Damon Herriman as Detective Inspector Lachlan Rogers
 Alex Andreas as Dimitri Panigiris
 Maria Mercedes as Freddie Lanagan
 Michael Ibbotson as Peter the Policeman
 Kamil Ellis as Sergeant Rodney Lammon
 The Umbilical Brothers (David Collins and Shane Dundas) as Helicopter pilots, Arlo and Jesse

Episodes

Production

Development
In February 2020, it was announced that BBC One and Stan would co-produce a limited mystery-thriller series written by Harry and Jack Williams, directed by Chris Sweeney, and produced by Two Brothers Pictures. HBO Max later joined as a co-producer and distributor for the US market.
In January 2021, Jamie Dornan, Danielle Macdonald, Shalom Brune-Franklin, Ólafur Darri Ólafsson, Alex Dimitriades, and Hugo Weaving joined the cast of the series. Damon Herriman replaced Hugo Weaving a week before filming started.

Filming

Season 1
Filming, which began in March 2021 in South Australia, took place in the regional towns of Port Augusta and Peterborough, and the Flinders Ranges, with some scenes shot in Adelaide. The production crew recreated Bali's Kuta Beach on Adelaide's North Haven Beach. Principal photography was concluded in July 2021.

Season 2
Filming for the second season will start in April 2023 with Jamie Dornan and Danielle Macdonald returning.

Release
The first episode of this limited series was released in the UK on 1 January 2022. Later all six episodes were released on BBC iPlayer. With an overall view of 18 million on its release, the series became the third most successful drama launch for the iPlayer. As  of March 2022, it became the most watched series on iPlayer.

The first episode was watched 6,428,000 times on iPlayer alone during 2022, making it the 3rd most viewed individual programme on the platform that year.

The series was also premiered in Australia the following day on Stan.

It debuted March 3 on HBO Max in the US and Latin America, and on Amazon Prime in Canada.

ZDF released the series on August 12 in Germany.

Reception

Critical response
Review aggregator Rotten Tomatoes reported 97% approval based on 31 reviews with an average rating of 7.60/10. The site's critics consensus reads: "Jamie Dornan makes for a compelling guide through The Tourist, a beguiling drama that deepens its mystery with solid shocks and welcome moments of levity." On Metacritic, the show has a weighted average score of 81 out of 100 based on 11 critics, indicating "universal acclaim". Critics particularly praised Dornan's and Macdonald's performances.

In a 4/5 stars review, Lucy Mangan wrote in The Guardian: "This outback thriller from the writer of The Missing is fun, stylish and clearly still has many twists up its sleeve." While Ed Cumming of The Independent addressed it as Dornan's best work until then, Lauren Morris in the Radio Times described it as "An unpredictable, edge-of-your-seat mystery that startles you with laugh-out-loud moments of ridiculousness." The Guardian ranked it number 24 on their list of best television shows of 2022. It also became the most-watched drama of 2022 in the UK.

Accolades

References

External links
 
 

English-language television shows
2022 American television series debuts
2020s American drama television series
2022 Australian television series debuts
2020s Australian drama television series
2022 British television series debuts
2020s British drama television series
2022 German television series debuts
2020s German drama television series
American thriller television series
British thriller television series
Fiction about amnesia
BBC television dramas
HBO Max original programming
Stan (service) original programming
Television series by All3Media
Television shows filmed in Australia
Television shows set in the Outback